Cardionema ramosissimum is a beach-dwelling plant in the family Caryophyllaceae, which is known by the common name sandcarpet.

Description
Cardionema ramosissimum is a flat or clumping mat-forming perennial plant which grows along the coastline of western North America, as well as Chile. From a taproot it extends many petite to sprawling stems up to 30 centimeters long and covered in very tiny leaves, which are about a centimeter long and needlelike.

Filling in the spaces between the spine-shaped leaves are long stipules. The plant bears tiny woolly flowers.

Uses
This thick plant forms a blanket on the sand and can be used for erosion control on beaches.

External links

Jepson Manual Treatment: Cardionema ramosissimum
USDA Plants Profile
Cardionema ramosissimum — U.C.Photo gallery

Caryophyllaceae
Flora of the West Coast of the United States
Flora of Chile
Flora of California
Flora without expected TNC conservation status